Huang Fu  (8 March 1883 – 6 December 1936) was a general and politician in early Republic of China.

Biography

Huang studied at Zhejiang Military College and Qiushi Academy (current Zhejiang University), later was sent to Japan in 1904. Huang came in contact with the Tongmenghui while studying at the Tokyo Shinbu Gakko, a military academy in Tokyo in 1905 and met Chiang Kai-shek and Zhang Qun in 1907 when they arrived to study in Japan as well. In 1908, he studied surveying under the Imperial Japanese Army, and returned to China in 1910.
During the 1911 Xinhai Revolution, he and Chen Qimei declared Shanghai to be independent of the Empire of China, and became blood brothers with Chiang Kai-shek.

He was forced to flee abroad after the failed Second Revolution of 1913 against Yuan Shikai, travelling via Japan to the United States, and returned in 1916 to participate in the final stages of the National Protection War, and to represent Zhejiang's military government in Beijing. When Sun Yat-sen ordered Kuomintang members to swear personal loyalty to him, Huang objected and left politics.

Huang reappeared into public life by supporting China's entry into World War I hoping it would regain lost territories. He worked with President Xu Shichang as a diplomat, co-wrote books about economics and foreign affairs and would often guest lecturer at universities.  He was part of China's delegation to the 1921 Washington Naval Conference which secured the Beiyang government's greatest diplomatic triumph, the return of Shandong.

After the fall of Cao Kun in the 1924 Beijing Coup, he joined the Zhili clique and became acting president of the Republic of China on the request of Feng Yuxiang. He declared Cao Kun's term illegal because it was obtained through bribery and also repudiated the agreement which allowed former Emperor Puyi to continue to live in the Forbidden City.

Huang was influential in winning over Feng Yuxiang and Yan Xishan to Chiang Kai-shek's faction of the Kuomintang (KMT) which was one of the major reasons why Wang Jingwei's Wuhan regime collapsed. He later served under several offices during the Nanjing decade including Shanghai mayor, foreign minister, and chairman of the North China Political Council.  Despite his close ties to Chiang, he never rejoined the KMT as he did not want to be associated with the opportunists who joined during and after the Northern Expedition. In 1933, he signed the unpopular Tanggu Truce which ceded Chahar, Rehe, and part of Hebei to Manchukuo. Like Chiang, he viewed the Communists as a greater threat than the Japanese.

Huang died of lung cancer in Shanghai in 1936.

Notes

1883 births
1936 deaths
Zhejiang University alumni
Politicians from Shaoxing
Republic of China politicians from Zhejiang
Tongmenghui members
People of the 1911 Revolution
People of the Northern Expedition
Mayors of Shanghai
Foreign Ministers of the Republic of China
Presidents of the Republic of China
Premiers of the Republic of China
Deaths from lung cancer
Deaths from cancer in China
People from Shangyu
Generals from Zhejiang